Monilispira is a genus of sea snails, marine gastropod mollusks in the family Pseudomelatomidae, the turrids and allies.

Species
Species within the genus Monilispira include:
 † Monilispira archeri Olsson & Harbison, 1953 
Monilispira bandata (Nowell-Usticke, 1969)
 † Monilispira bigemma (Dall, 1890)
Monilispira circumcincta Nowell-Usticke, 1969
 Monilispira lysidia (Duclos, 1850)
Monilispira monilifera (Carpenter, 1857)
Species brought into synonymy
Monilispira crassiplicata Kuroda & Oyama, 1971: synonym of Splendrillia crassiplicata (Kuroda & Oyama, 1971)
Monilispira leucocyma (Dall, 1884): synonym of Pilsbryspira leucocyma (Dall, 1884)
Monilispira monilis Bartsch & Rehder, 1939: synonym of Pilsbryspira monilis (Bartsch & Rehder, 1939)
Monilispira ochsneri Hertlein & Strong, 1949: synonym of Cleospira ochsneri (Hertlein & Strong, 1949)

References

External links
 
  Bouchet, P.; Kantor, Y. I.; Sysoev, A.; Puillandre, N. (2011). A new operational classification of the Conoidea (Gastropoda). Journal of Molluscan Studies. 77(3): 273-308 
 Worldwide Mollusc Species Data Base: Pseudomelatomidae
 P.J. Fallon, Descriptions and illustrations of some new and poorly known turrids (Turridae) of the tropical northwestern Atlantic. Part 2. Genus Crassispira Swainson, 1840 subgenera Monilispira Bartsch and Rehder, 1939 and Dallspira Bartsch, 1950; The Nautilus 125, 2011

 

 
Pseudomelatomidae
Gastropod genera